Sex and the College Girl (also known as The Fun Lovers)  is a 1964 American comedy film directed by Joseph Adler and starring  John Gabriel, Luana Anders and Charles Grodin.

Plot 
This is a "slice-of-life" film set primarily around a Puerto Rican luxury hotel frequented by young East Coast weekenders.

Cast  
  John Gabriel  as  Larry Devon
  Luana Anders  as Gwen
  Charles Grodin  as Bob
  Julie Sommars  as Susan
  Richard Arlen  as Charles Devon
  Valora Noland  as Vickie
  William Kerwin   as Tentor

Reception  
The film has been described as "a low-budget version of Sex and the Single Girl".

References

External links

1964 comedy films
1964 films
American comedy films
Films directed by Joseph Adler
1960s English-language films
1960s American films